Ankudinovskaya is a rural locality (a village) in Nizhneslobodskoye Rural Settlement, Vozhegodsky District, Vologda Oblast, Russia. The population was 14 as of 2002.

Geography 
Ankudinovskaya is located 43 km east of Vozhega (the district's administrative centre) by road. Olyushinskaya is the nearest rural locality.

References 

Rural localities in Vozhegodsky District